Kalim Aajiz (1920 – 14 February 2015) was an Indian writer of Urdu literature and a poet. He was an academic and chairman of the Urdu Advisory Committee of the Government of Bihar. He was a recipient of the fourth highest Indian civilian honour of Padma Shri from the Government of India in 1989.

Early life and career
Kalim Aajiz was born in 1920 at Telhara, Nalanda district, a small village which had been home to an ancient Buddhist monastery in Nalanda district of the Indian state of Bihar. He secured his graduate and master's degrees in Urdu from Patna University after which he obtained his doctoral degree in 1965. His doctoral thesis, Evolution of Urdu Literature in Bihar, has since been published as a book.

Aajiz continued his association with Patna University by joining the institution as a member of its Urdu language faculty and retired as a professor of the department. After retirement, he was appointed as the Chairman of the Urdu Advisory Committee, Government of Bihar, a post he held till his death.

Aajiz began writing poems at the age of 17 and started appearing in mushairas from 1949. His first book of ghazals was published in 1976 and the book was released at Vigyan Bhawan by the then President of India, Fakhruddin Ali Ahmed. This was followed by several publications such as Jub Fasle Baharan Aai Thi (When the spring arrived), Woh Jo Shayri Ka Sabab Hua, Jab Fasl Bahar Aayei Thi and Jahan Khushboo Hi Khusboo Thi. His mushairas have been hosted in many places including Dallas, US.

Publications
Kalim's literary works include:
 Abhī sun lo mujh se
 Daftar-i gum gashtah : Bihār men̲ Urdū shāʻirī kā irtiqā
 Dil se jo bāta nikalī g̲h̲azal ho gayi (selection of poetry in Hindi)/ edited by Mohd. Zakir Hussain, Vani Prakashan Publisher, New Delhi; 1st edition (1 January 2014)
 Jab faṣl-i bahārān̲ āʼī thī (When the spring arrived)
 Jahan Khushboo Hi Khushboo Thi (Where There Was Plenty of Fragrance)
 Kūcah-yi jānān̲ jānān̲
 Majlis-i Adab 
 'Vuh jo shāʻirī kā sabab huʻā

Death and legacy
Aajiz, who had four sons and two daughters, died on 14 February 2015 at Hazaribagh in Jharkhand, at the age of 94. After the funeral at Gandhi Maidan, Patna which was attended to by thousands of people, he was buried at Telhara, his native place.

Firaq Gorakhpuri, another Urdu poet, sent him a message while lying on his deathbed in 1982, in which he respectfully said that he felt jealous of Kalim Aajiz due to the ease in which Kalim Aajiz could express his thoughts through his verses.

See also
 Fuzail Ahmad Nasiri
 Ghazal

References

External links
 

Recipients of the Padma Shri in literature & education
1920 births
2015 deaths
Educators from Bihar
20th-century Indian Muslims
Indian male poets
Urdu-language poets from India
People from Nalanda district
Patna University alumni
Academic staff of Patna University
20th-century Indian poets
Poets from Bihar
20th-century Indian male writers